Straight to the Heart is a 2016 Filipino independent LGBT-themed drama-comedy film starring Carl Guevara and Gwen Zamora. The film is written and directed by Dave Fabros. It is presented by Cignal, Mediaquest, PLDT Smart, in association with Unitel, a production by Visioncapture Media, in partnership with Creative Minds Strategic Marketing and Events, and Creative Saints, sponsored by David's Salon and Watsons.

The film was an official entry to the 2nd CineFilipino Film Festival.

In the film, Carl plays the role of a gay hairdresser who falls into a coma and when he wakes up is being attracted to women.

Cast

Main
Carl Guevara
Gwen Zamora

Supporting
 Nico Antonio
 Ricci Chan
 Vincent de Jesus
 Kiko Matos
 Pinky Amador
 Dina Padilla
 Cris Lomotan
 Gilleth Sandico
 Bibo Reyes
 Enrico Cuenca
 Garie Concepcion

References

2016 LGBT-related films
2016 films
Filipino-language films
Philippine LGBT-related films